GPT2 may refer to:
 the human gene expressing Glutamic--pyruvic transaminase 2
GPT-2, a text generating model developed by OpenAI